Manujan County is in Kerman province, Iran. The capital of the county is the city of Manujan. At the 2006 census, the county's population was 63,270 in 13,361 households. The following census in 2011 counted 64,528 people in 16,442 households, by which time Deh Kahan Rural District had been separated from the county to join Kahnuj County. At the 2016 census, the county's population was 65,705 in 18,352 households. The people of Manujan are Baloch and Balochi is the predominant language.

Administrative divisions

The population history and structural changes of Manujan County's administrative divisions over three consecutive censuses are shown in the following table. The latest census shows two districts, five rural districts, and two cities.

References

 

Counties of Kerman Province